The Carefree Sundial, in Carefree, Arizona, was designed by architect Joe Wong and solar engineer John I. Yellott (1908-1986), was erected in the Sundial Circle plaza in 1959. The sundial is made from a steel frame and covered in anodized copper. As originally designed the 1200mm wide gnomon acted as a heat collecting plate for a local heating scheme. It measures  in diameter. Local apparent time is 27.7 minutes behind the meridian time which here is Mountain Standard Time. The hour markers are adjusted accordingly.

Description
The Carefree sundial was conceived and constructed by John Yellott of Phoenix, Arizona, the architect was Joe Wong. It is encircled by cacti and stones surrounding a reflecting pool with golden lines and concrete numbers to mark the time. Once it was visible from  but a shopping-centre has developed around it, obscuring the view. The hour-lines are offset to account for plaza's longitude, 6° 35' 36" west of the Mountain Standard Time meridian, 105° west. The gnomon served an ancillary purpose- designed to absorb solar energy which was converted into heat by three copper tubes, which pumped the heated water into a local heating system for a neighbouring office block. To facilitate the absorption the top  of the gnomon's length is coated with a special paint. A smaller 1/48 scale model is on site along with an equation of time table.

Disputed claims
Various communities have made "the largest sundial in" claims. In 1913 the sundial in Ingleside Terraces, San Francisco was claimed to be the largest in the world, ignoring the existence of the dials at Jaipur. There is even a larger one at Hunters Point in San Francisco. The Carefree claim is disputed by Sun City, Arizona who have repaired their competing dial which is built from a steel I-bar.

Gallery

References
Footnotes

Notes

Sundials